Jethro Thomas Robinson (1829 – 15 July 1878) was an English architect who specialised in theatres.

Career 
Jethro Thomas Robinson was theatre architectural adviser to the lord chamberlain. He was responsible for the 1871 reconstruction of the Pavilion Theatre, Whitechapel, which increased its capacity to 4,000 and the surviving interiors of the Old Vic in London (1872) and the Theatre Royal Margate (1874).

Robinson lived in Haverstock Hill in 1873 and later, 20 Bloomsbury Square in 1877; he died there the following year at the age of 49 having created seven successful theatres in the previous seven years.

He was the father-in-law of architect Frank Matcham who joined his practice, then married his younger daughter Hannah Maria Robinson (1847/8–1920) on 9 July 1877. Matcham took over his late father-in-law's architectural practice following his death and completed rebuilding the Elephant and Castle Theatre, London.

References

1829 births
1878 deaths
English theatre architects